The Oleo Strut was a GI Coffeehouse located in Killeen, Texas, from 1968 to 1972. Like its namesake, a shock absorber in the landing gear of most large aircraft and many smaller ones, the Oleo Strut’s purpose was to help GIs land softly. Upon returning from Vietnam to Fort Hood, shell-shocked soldiers found solace amongst the Strut’s regulars, mostly fellow soldiers and a few civilian sympathizers. The GIs turned the Oleo Strut into one of Texas’s anti-war headquarters, publishing an underground anti-war newspaper, organizing boycotts, setting up a legal office, and leading peace marches.

The coffeehouse was an organizing center for the support of the Fort Hood 43, a group of Black soldiers who had been disciplined for refusing to perform riot control duty at the Democratic National Convention in Chicago.

See also
 GI Coffeehouses
 Under the Hood Café
 Sir! No Sir!

References

External links
John Kniffin biography in The Veteran
Another Fine Mess website

GI Coffeehouses
Fort Hood
Restaurants established in 1968
1968 establishments in Texas
Restaurants in Texas
1972 disestablishments in Texas